Shots Fired may refer to:

 Shots Fired (TV series), 10-part TV series 2017
 Shots Fired (song), song by American rapper Megan Thee Stallion 2020
 Shots Fired, album by MojoJojo 2015

See also 
 Shotz Fired
 Shot (pellet)